Anthony Nathan Parsons (born 3 November 1989) is a singer-songwriter, producer, and entertainer from England. Parsons has released eleven singles and one EP to date.

Personal life 
Parsons was born in Bolsover, Derbyshire, England. He still resides there and is married with two children and two step-children.

Early life 
Growing up, Parsons displayed some musical ability, playing keyboard and writing snippets of songs. His parents have said that as a child Parsons was always drumming his fingers on furniture and tapping out beats that he had come up with. He has candidly stated that these early snippets of songs were "never any good" but that he was always creating something and learning. His songwriting developed as he grew older and his creations grew into fuller and more complete songs.

As a child Parsons was a member of the Bolsover Drama Club and enjoyed acting.

Early career

YouTube 
In 2007, Parsons began his music career by posting videos on YouTube featuring himself singing cover songs. These would be recorded in the style of him sitting and facing a camera whilst singing into a hand-held microphone. Most of these early videos were recorded whilst Parsons was working on a night shift as a security guard and the background in his videos often featured various workplace settings. The first song that Parsons covered was "Your Song" by Elton John. The song was recorded a cappella featuring just Parsons' vocals. He received a positive response to this video which prompted him to record and release more videos onto YouTube.

Parsons' videos began to reach wider audiences and his videos for "Wavin' Flag" and "Love Me" achieved views of 23,000 and 97,000 respectively.

Live shows in America 
In 2015, one of Parsons' YouTube videos, featuring a cover of Celine Dion's "I'm Alive", caught the attention of talent scouts in America. They arranged for Parsons to travel to Florida where he performed a number of live shows for them including at the World of Beer Festival in Florida.

Music releases

"I'll Be"
"I'll Be" was his debut single and was released on 8 December 2018. The song was written by Parsons and is a pop ballad.

"Fall For You"
"Fall For You" is a pop/rock ballad written by Parsons and released on 12 March 2019.

"Never Enough"
In 2018, Parsons released a YouTube video featuring himself singing a cover of "Never Enough" from the motion picture, The Greatest Showman.  The video proved popular and with views of over 300,000 across all platforms it remains Parsons most successful video release. In response to numerous requests from fans, Parsons released "Never Enough" as a single on 19 April 2019. The recording that Parsons used as a single is the same audio performance that featured in the video.

"Summer Rain"
"Summer Rain" is a dance/tropical upbeat song written by Parsons and released as a single on 14 June 2019. "Summer Rain" was picked up by BBC Music Introducing East Midlands and was played on BBC Radio Nottingham, BBC Radio Derby, BBC Radio Leicester and BBC Radio Lincolnshire.

'The Beat' radio show described "Summer Rain" as a 'great track' and it remains Parsons most streamed song on Spotify.

"Gone, Gone, Gone"
"Gone, Gone, Gone", is a cover of the Phillip Phillips' song and was released by Parsons on 7 August 2019. "Gone, Gone, Gone" was originally recorded in 2013 and was released with a video onto YouTube in that same year. However, the song was not available commercially until 2019. The music video was filmed by Parsons' brother and features different locations around the Bolsover area.

"Doin' It Right"
"Doin' It Right" is an original song released by Parsons on 20 October 2019. The song was written by Michael Jay Margules and Chen Neeman. Parsons loved the demo of the song and decided to record and release it as his next single.

"Rise Above It All"
Parsons' first release of 2020 was the charity single, "Rise Above It All". This is an original song written by Michael Jay Margules. Parsons was invited to be the lead vocalist on a charity song to raise money for the 'NHS Charities Together Covid-19 Urgent Appeal' and the 'Care Workers Charity', with each charity receiving 50% of all proceeds. The song and video was intended to reflect the situation the UK was facing with the COVID-19 pandemic and the lockdown.

Having listened to numerous demos, "Rise Above It All" was selected to be recorded and released due to the lyrics which it was thought fit the current situation. The song was also upbeat and motivational. Parsons created the accompanying music video by making a request via social media for people to send in their videos of nurses, doctors, emergency services and members of the public taking part in the 'clap for carers'. The official music video features numerous such videos in addition to nurses dancing in various hospital and care settings.

The song received an overwhelming positive reception and was picked up by BBC Music Introducing East Midlands. The song was played by BBC Radio Nottingham, BBC Radio Derby, BBC Radio Sheffield, BBC Radio Lincolnshire, BBC Radio Leicester and BBC Radio Suffolk. "Rise Above It All" was named as BBC Radio Derby's Track of the Week and received extensive airplay on that station.

It is Parsons' biggest selling single to date.

"The World Outside My Window"
"The World Outside My Window" is a pop/rock style song written by Parsons.  It was released on 12 July 2020.

"The End of The Beginning"
He released his debut EP on 30 October 2020. The EP contained four original songs.

Track list:
 "Outta Nowhere"
 "Goose Bumps"
 "The Islands"
 "More Than You Could Ever Dream"

"Outta Nowhere" was picked up by BBC Radio Nottingham and played on several prime time shows.

"The Climb"
Parsons released a cover version of Miley Cyrus' "The Climb" on 20 December 2020.

"I'm Your Angel"
Parsons released a cover version of I'm Your Angel on 15 March 2021.

"So Glad It's Christmas Time"
Parsons released his first Christmas song, 'So Glad It's Christmas Time', on 17th December 2021. He wrote the song about being a dad at Christmas time and seeing the excitement of his children on Christmas Eve. The accompanying music video was filmed around his hometown of Bolsover.

Live shows
Parsons is a prolific live act and performs over 200 lives shows a year across the UK. His live shows have been so successful that he was able to leave his job as a security guard in 2019 and become a full time entertainer.

Awards

Roots Live Music Awards 2020
 Best Songwriter – Nominated
 Best Solo Live Act – Nominated
 Best Original Song (Summer Rain) – Nominated

Hero of Bolsover Award
On 9 September 2020, Parsons was presented with the 'Hero of Bolsover Award' by Bolsover MP Mark Fletcher. This was in recognition of his charity single, "Rise Above It All".

GITM Award
 Best Solo Male - Won
 Single of The Year (Rise Above It All) - Won
 EP of The Year (The End of The Beginning) - Won
 Special Award (given for his charity single, 'Rise Above It All')

Anthony received 4 awards at the 2020 GITM Awards

Other notable projects
In 2016, Parsons was a judge on the show Derbyshire's Best Singer.

Charity work
Parsons has performed live at numerous charity and fundraising events; performing for free and taking part in publicity for the cause.

He has also provided vocals on two charity song releases; "Rise Above It All" in 2020 and also as a guest vocalist on "A Children's Christmas Time" in 2017. This was a charity Christmas single organised by Chesterfield's Spire Radio and featuring various local artists. The single was in aid of both Ashgate Hospicecare and Teenage Cancer Trust.

References

External links 
 

1989 births
Living people
People from Bolsover
English male singer-songwriters